Spencer High School is a public high school located in Spencer, in Marathon County, Wisconsin.

Spencer High School has multiple extracurricular activities such as: football, basketball, softball, baseball, track & field, cross country, volleyball, wrestling, drama club, history club, Facebook, forensics, FFA, FBLA, and more. The average size of graduating classes is about 40-60 students.

Notes

External links

Public high schools in Wisconsin
Schools in Marathon County, Wisconsin